"Munch (Feelin' U)" is a song by American rapper Ice Spice, released on August 10, 2022.

Composition
"Munch (Feelin' U)" is a drill song. Lyrically, Ice Spice expresses her disgust toward a disloyal man, addressing him as a "munch": "You thought I was feelin' you? / That nigga a munch". Pitchforks Ryan Dombal called on Merriam-Webster to introduce Ice Spice's definition of the word, a "particularly clueless kind of guy—a dummy, a sucker, a simp", into its dictionaries.

Release and promotion
When Ice Spice announced the song on social media, she shared a screenshot revealing that she had received a cosign from Canadian rapper Drake as a result of the track. Upon its release, the song quickly began trending on the video-sharing app TikTok.

Critical reception
The song received generally positive reviews. Writing for The Fader, David Renshaw praised Ice Spice's "effortless confidence" in the song and commented, "she flexes for two minutes straight, offering up quotable lines ('You know my body, I do it with ease') and outsized comic imagery ('I'm walkin' past him, he sniffin' my breeze')". Jon Caramanica of The New York Times wrote, "In a frenzied genre, she's a calm rapper, which is part of what makes this song so frosty—the beat is skittish and portentous, but Ice Spice sounds at peace. She's rhyming quickly, but also calmly and slightly dismissively, probably because of the subject matter." Pitchfork ranked the song the 30th best of 2022, praising how Ice Spice "balances her brashness with a supremely unbothered delivery, as if she's been swatting away munches for decades. Centuries, even."

Music video 
The video for the song was directed by George Buford and features Ice Spice dancing with a group of friends and supporters in various locations in The Bronx, such as at a park, in front of Paya Deli, and at a photoshoot.

Charts

References

2022 singles
2022 songs
Ice Spice songs
Songs written by Ice Spice